The Better Residents Association is a minor South African political party formed by disgruntled African National Congress members in 2011. Initially formed as the Bushbuckridge Residents Association, the party changed its name in order to contest elections in all provinces.

Vigilantism 
In February 2017, the party's president, Delta Mokoena, began a 10-year prison sentence for vigilantism. He was convicted in 2013 of threatening to burn a resident and his house if the man, whom he accused of having a thief as a son, did not leave the area.

The party has been accused of 'causing a reign of terror', making use of kangaroo courts, torturing suspected criminals, and banishing residents it accused of being witches or Satanists.

Public representatives
Cleopas Maunye served as the party's sole representative in the provincial legislature until he was recalled from the legislature in March 2017. Cecil Shilakwe was appointed his successor.

Election results
The party won its first seats at local government level in the 2011 municipal elections, and after the 2016 municipal elections holds seats in the Bushbuckridge and Bela-Bela local municipalities.

The party also won one seat in the Mpumalanga Provincial Legislature in the 2014 general election, although it lost it in the 2019 election.

In December 2020, the party lost 3 of its 14 seats in the Bushbuckridge Local Municipality after it expelled three of its ward councillors, and did not contest the resulting by-elections.

National elections

|-
! Election
! Total votes
! Share of vote
! Seats 
! +/–
! Government
|-
! 2014
| 15,271
| 0.08%
| 
|  ±0
| 
|-
! 2019
| 9,179
| 0.05%
| 
|  ±0
| 
|}

Provincial elections

! rowspan=2 | Election
! colspan=2 | Eastern Cape
! colspan=2 | Free State
! colspan=2 | Gauteng
! colspan=2 | Kwazulu-Natal
! colspan=2 | Limpopo
! colspan=2 | Mpumalanga
! colspan=2 | North-West
! colspan=2 | Northern Cape
! colspan=2 | Western Cape
|- 
! % !! Seats
! % !! Seats
! % !! Seats
! % !! Seats
! % !! Seats
! % !! Seats
! % !! Seats
! % !! Seats
! % !! Seats
|-
! 2014
| - || -
| - || -
| - || -
| - || -
| - || -
| 1.15% || 1/30
| - || -
| - || -
| - || -
|-
! 2019
| - || -
| - || -
| 0.01 || 0/73
| - || -
| 0.04 || 0/49
| 0.72% || 0/30
| - || -
| - || -
| - || -
|}

Municipal elections

|-
! Election
! Votes
! %
|-
! 2016
| 73,468
| 0.19%
|-
|}

References

External links

2011 establishments in South Africa
African National Congress breakaway groups
Political parties established in 2011
Political parties in South Africa
Social democratic parties in South Africa